Louis Leonard Hasley (November 3, 1906 – May 1986) was an American writer, poet, essayist, editor, and critic. He was also a professor of English at the University of Notre Dame from 1931 to 1973. He was married to the writer Lucile Hasley.

References

1906 births
1986 deaths
University of Notre Dame faculty
American academics of English literature
American male poets
20th-century American poets
American male essayists
20th-century American essayists
20th-century American male writers